Lucian Bute vs. Glen Johnson was a boxing Super Middleweight fight for the IBF World title at the Pepsi Coliseum, Quebec City in Canada and will be distributed by Showtime. Bute had hoped to match him with former titleholder Mikkel Kessler of Denmark. When Kessler declined the bout—he will instead challenge titlist Robert Stieglitz on Nov. 5 in Denmark. They then turned to former middleweight champion Kelly Pavlik, who said he wanted the fight but he also ended up turning down the bout because he was unhappy with the $1.35 million offer he received from Top Rank to challenge Bute.

Lucian Bute defeated Glen Johnson via unanimous decision.

Background

Bute 
In July, Bute returned to his native Romania, where he had fought once earlier in his career but had dreamed of making a title defense there. He scored a fourth-round knockout against mandatory challenger Jean Paul Mendy. The November fight will mark the first time Bute has gone back-to-back fights away from Montreal since 2004.

Johnson 
Johnson was bumped out of Showtime's Super Six World Boxing Classic semifinals in June when he lost a competitive decision to titleholder Carl Froch. But it was a good enough performance to earn Johnson another title shot.

Undercard

Televised
Super Middleweight Championship  Lucian Bute (c)  vs.  Glen Johnson 
Bute defeated Johnson via unanimous decision. (119-109, 120-108, 120-108)

Super Lightweight bout:  Pier Olivier Cote vs.  Jorge Teron
Cote defeated Teron via KO at 0:33 of the third round.

Preliminary card
Super Bantamweight bout:  Steve Molitor vs.  Sebastien Gauthier	
Molitor defeated Gauthier via split decision. (96-94, 94-96, 96-94)

Super Middleweight bout:  Allan Green vs.  Sébastien Demers	

Welterweight bout:  Kevin Bizier vs.  Ivan Valle	
Bizier defeated Valle via KO of the third round.

Super Featherweight bout:  Rances Barthelemy vs.  Luis Ernesto Jose	
Barthelemy defeated Jose via TKO of the sixth round.

Light Heavyweight bout:  Schiller Hyppolite vs.  Dale Golden	
Hyppolite defeated Golden via TKO at 2:28 of the first round.

International Broadcasting

Notes

External links
Bute vs. Johnson Official Fight Card from BoxRec

Boxing matches
2011 in boxing
Boxing in Canada
Sport in Quebec City
2011 in Canadian sports
November 2011 sports events in Canada